Emmanuelle Léonard (born 1971) is a Canadian photographer and Video artist.

Education
Léonard received an MFA degree in visual and media art from the Université du Québec à Montréal in 2002.

Work
Léonard's creative practice explores the aesthetic dimensions of documentary styles as well as the ideas of institutional authority and power. She is particularly interested in legal photography and administrative archives, which she manipulates to question and explore the idea of proof.

Collections
Her work is included in the collections of the Musée national des beaux-arts du Québec and the Musée d'art contemporain de Montréal.

References

Living people
1971 births
20th-century Canadian women artists
21st-century Canadian women artists
Artists from Montreal